Gringley on the Hill, Nottinghamshire, is an English village and parish. The population of the civil parish at the 2011 census was 699. It is on the highest part of the road from Bawtry to Gainsborough, six miles east-southeast of the former, and the same distance west by north of the latter town.

Location 

From its situation on the loftiest of the promontories which overlook the wide extent of Misson Carr and Misterton Carr, it commands such extensive prospects that Lincoln Cathedral can be seen from it on a clear day, across the vale of the Trent, whilst in the nearer distance, the Chesterfield Canal appears emerging from the tunnel at Drakeholes, and winding under the long ridge of hills which extends eastward to the River Trent.

Antiquities 

The English Heritage Archive includes three sites located in the village, as well as the church.
These are the site of a prehistoric hillfort at Beacon Hill, the stump of a medieval market cross, and a four-storey tower windmill dating from 1830.

Church 

The St Peter & St Paul's Church, Gringley on the Hill is of Norman construction, with a later Perpendicular tower. Of note is an Early English pillar piscina, a free-standing bowl for washing the communion vessels.

Windmill

A brick tower windmill was built at Gringley c. 1830 by Jabez Wilkinson, replacing a post mill on the same site. The four-storey tower was derelict by 1977.

2022 temperature record

References

External links

 http://www.genuki.org.uk/big/eng/NTT/GringleyontheHill/White1853.html
 http://www.gringleyvillage.org.uk/
 http://www.oldnotts.co.uk/churches/gringley.htm
 http://www.nottinghamshire.gov.uk/home/youandyourcommunity/communitylocalcontacts/parishes/parisheslist/parisheslist-details.htm?parishid=9473

 
Villages in Nottinghamshire
Civil parishes in Nottinghamshire
Bassetlaw District